Unfoldment may refer to:

 Implicate and explicate order, according to David Bohm, a physics theory

See also
 Unfold (disambiguation)